The Final Cut is the twelfth studio album by English rock band Pink Floyd, released on 21 March 1983 through Harvest and Columbia Records. It comprises unused material from the band's previous studio album, The Wall (1979), alongside new material recorded throughout 1982.

The Final Cut was the last Pink Floyd album to feature founding member Roger Waters, who departed from the band in 1985. It is also the only Pink Floyd album not to feature founding member and keyboardist Richard Wright, who had left the band under pressure from Waters after the Wall sessions. The recording was plagued by conflict; guitarist David Gilmour felt many of the tracks were not worthy of inclusion, but Waters accused him of failing to contribute material himself. Drummer Nick Mason's contributions were mostly limited to sound effects.

Waters planned the album as a soundtrack for the 1982 film adaptation of The Wall. With the onset of the Falklands War, he rewrote it as a concept album exploring what he considered the betrayal of his father, who died serving in the Second World War. Waters provided lead vocals for all but one track, and he is credited for all songwriting. The album was accompanied by a short film released in the same year.

The Final Cut received mixed reviews, though retrospective reception has been more favourable. Though it reached number one in the UK and number six in the US, it was the lowest-selling Pink Floyd studio album worldwide since their sixth album, Meddle (1971).

Background
The Final Cut was conceived as a soundtrack album for Pink Floyd – The Wall, the 1982 film based on Pink Floyd's previous studio album The Wall (1979). Under its working title Spare Bricks, it would have featured new music rerecorded for the film, such as "When the Tigers Broke Free". Bassist, vocalist, and primary songwriter Roger Waters also planned to record a small amount of new material, expanding The Wall'''s narrative.

As a result of the Falklands War, Waters changed direction and wrote new material. He saw British Prime Minister Margaret Thatcher's response to Argentina's invasion of the islands as jingoistic and unnecessary, and dedicated the new album—provisionally titled Requiem for a Post-War Dream—to his father, Eric Fletcher Waters. A second lieutenant of the 8th Royal Fusiliers, Eric Waters died during the Second World War at Aprilia in Italy, on 18 February 1944, when Roger was five months old. Waters said:

Guitarist David Gilmour disliked Waters' politicising, and the new creative direction prompted arguments. Five other tracks not used on The Wall ("Your Possible Pasts", "One of the Few", "The Final Cut", "The Fletcher Memorial Home", and "The Hero's Return") had been set aside for Spare Bricks, and although Pink Floyd had often reused material, Gilmour felt the songs were not good enough for a new studio album. He wanted to write new material, but Waters remained doubtful as Gilmour had lately contributed little new music. Gilmour said:

The title The Final Cut is a reference to William Shakespeare's Julius Caesar: "This was the most unkindest cut of all". "When the Tigers Broke Free" was issued as a single titled "Pink Floyd: The Wall: Music from the Film" on 26 July 1982, with the film version of "Bring the Boys Back Home" on the B-side; the single was labelled "Taken from the album The Final Cut" but was not included on that album until the 2004 CD reissue.

ConceptThe Final Cut is an anti-war concept album that explores what Waters regards as the betrayal of fallen British servicemen—such as his father—who during the Second World War sacrificed their lives in the spirit of a post-war dream. This post-war dream was that their victory would usher in a more peaceful world, whose leaders would no longer be so eager to resolve disputes by resorting to war. The album's lyrics are critical of Thatcher, whose policies and decisions Waters regarded as an example of this betrayal. She is referred to as "Maggie" throughout the album.

The opening track, "The Post War Dream", begins with a recorded announcement that the replacement for the Atlantic Conveyor, a ship lost during the Falklands campaign, will be built in Japan. Waters' lyrics refer to his dead father, the loss of Britain's shipbuilding industry to Japan, and Margaret Thatcher, before moving on to "Your Possible Pasts", a rewritten version of a song rejected for The Wall. In "One of the Few", another rejected song, the schoolteacher from The Wall features as the main character, presented as a war hero returned to civilian life. He is unable to relate his experiences to his wife, and in "The Hero's Return" is tormented by the loss of one of his aircrew. "The Gunner's Dream" discusses the post-war dream of a world free from tyranny and the threat of terrorism (a reference to the Hyde Park bombing). It is followed in "Paranoid Eyes" by the teacher's descent into alcoholism.

The second half deals with various war issues. While "Southampton Dock" is a lament to returning war heroes and other soldiers heading out to a likely death, "Not Now John" addresses society's ignorance of political and economic problems. "Get Your Filthy Hands Off My Desert" deals with Waters' feelings about war and invasion, and "The Fletcher Memorial Home" (the title is a nod to Waters' father) reflects a fantastical application of "the final solution" on a gathering of political leaders including Leonid Brezhnev, Menachem Begin and Margaret Thatcher. The album's titular song deals with the aftermath of a man's isolation and sexual repression, as he contemplates suicide and struggles to reconnect with the world around him. The album ends with "Two Suns in the Sunset", which portrays a nuclear holocaust: the final result of a world obsessed with war and control.

Recording

American composer Michael Kamen, who had contributed to The Wall, co-produced, oversaw the orchestral arrangements, and mediated between Waters and Gilmour. He also stood in for keyboardist Richard Wright, who had left the band under pressure from Waters during the recording of The Wall. James Guthrie was studio engineer and co-producer, while Mason's drumming was supplemented by Ray Cooper on percussion; when Mason was unable to perform the complex time changes on "Two Suns in the Sunset", he was replaced by session musician Andy Newmark. Mason also suggested the repeated reprises of "Maggie, what have we done" be rendered instrumental rather than sung. Raphael Ravenscroft was hired to play the saxophone. Recording took place in the latter half of 1982 across eight studios, including Gilmour's home studio at Hookend Manor, and Waters' Billiard Room Studios at East Sheen. The other studios were Mayfair Studios, Olympic Studios, Abbey Road Studios, Eel Pie Studios, Audio International and RAK Studios.

Tensions soon emerged, and while Waters and Gilmour initially worked together, playing the video game Donkey Kong (1981) in their spare time, they eventually chose to work separately. Engineer Andy Jackson worked with Waters on vocals; Guthrie with Gilmour on guitars. They would occasionally meet to discuss the work that had been completed; while this method was not in itself unusual, Gilmour began to feel strained, sometimes barely maintaining his composure. Kamen too felt pressured; Waters had never been a confident vocalist and, on one occasion, after repeated studio takes, Waters noticed him writing on a notepad. Losing his temper, he demanded to know what Kamen was doing, only to find that Kamen had been writing, "I Must Not Fuck Sheep" repeatedly. "A lot of that aggravation came through in the vocal performance," Waters observed, "which, looking back, really was quite tortured."

Like previous studio albums by the band, The Final Cut used sound effects combined with advances in audio recording technology. Mason's contributions were mostly limited to recording sound effects for the experimental Holophonic system, an audio processing technique used to add an enhanced three-dimensional effect to the recordings; The Final Cut is the second album ever to feature this technology. The technique is featured on "Get Your Filthy Hands Off My Desert", creating a sound of an explosion that surrounds the listener. Sound effects from earlier Floyd albums are also used; the wind from Meddle (1971) is reused, as are parts of The Dark Side of the Moon (1973), Wish You Were Here (1975), Animals (1977) and The Wall (1979).

After months of poor relations, and following a final confrontation, Gilmour was removed from the credit list as producer, but was still paid production royalties. Waters later said that he was also under significant pressure and that early in production believed he would never record with Gilmour or Mason again. He may have threatened to release the album as a solo record, although Pink Floyd were contracted to EMI and such a move would have been unlikely. Mason kept himself distant, dealing with marital problems. In an August 1987 interview, Waters recalled The Final Cut as an "absolute misery to make", and that the band members were "fighting like cats and dogs". He said the experience forced them to accept that they had not worked together as a band since their ninth studio album Wish You Were Here (1975).

Packaging

Storm Thorgerson, a founder member of Hipgnosis (designers of most of Pink Floyd's previous and future artwork), was passed over for the cover design. Instead, Waters created the cover himself, using photographs taken by his brother-in-law, Willie Christie. The front cover shows a Remembrance poppy and four Second World War medal ribbons against the black fabric of the jacket or blazer on which they are worn. From left to right, the medals are the 1939–1945 Star, the Africa Star, the Defence Medal, and the Distinguished Flying Cross.

The poppy is a recurring design theme. The interior gatefold featured three photographs, the first depicting an outdoor scene with an outstretched hand holding three poppies and in the distance, a soldier with his back to the camera. Two more photographs show a welder at work, his mask emblazoned with the Japanese Rising Sun Flag, and a nuclear explosion (a clear reference to "Two Suns in the Sunset"). The album's lyrics are printed on the gatefold. Side one of the vinyl disc carries an image of a poppy field, and on side two, a soldier with a knife in his back lies face down amongst the poppies, a dog beside him. 

The back cover features a photograph of an officer standing upright and holding a film canister, with a knife protruding from his back: the film canister and knife may reflect Waters' tumultuous relationship with The Wall film director Alan Parker.

 Film The Final Cut was accompanied by a short film. It features the songs "The Gunner's Dream", "The Final Cut", "The Fletcher Memorial Home" and "Not Now John". Produced and written by Waters and directed by his brother-in-law Willie Christie, it features Waters talking to a psychiatrist named A. Parker-Marshall. Alex McAvoy, who played the teacher in Pink Floyd – The Wall, also appears. The film was released on Betamax and VHS in July 1983 and was one of EMI's first "video EPs".

 Release and sales The Final Cut was released in the UK on 21 March 1983. It reached number one in the UK, surpassing The Dark Side of the Moon and The Wall. It was less successful in America, peaking at number six on the Billboard album charts. Issued as a single, "Not Now John" reached the UK Top 30, with its chorus of "Fuck all that" bowdlerised to "Stuff all that".

With over 1,000,000 units shipped in the United States, the Recording Industry Association of America (RIAA) certified The Final Cut Platinum in May 1983. It was given double Platinum certification in 1997. However, The Final Cut was the lowest-selling Pink Floyd studio album in the United States and worldwide since Meddle. Gilmour claimed that this relative commercial failure supported his assertion that much of the material was weak. Waters responded that it was "ridiculous" to judge a record by its sales, and that he had been approached by a woman in a shop whose father had also been killed in World War II and told him The Final Cut was "the most moving record she had ever heard". In 1983, Gilmour said The Final Cut was "very good but it's not personally how I would see a Pink Floyd record going".The Final Cut was released on CD in 1983. A remastered and repackaged CD was issued by EMI in Europe and on Capitol Records in the US in 2004; this included an extra song, the previously released "When the Tigers Broke Free". In 2007, a remastered version was released as part of the Oh, by the Way box set, packaged in a miniature replica of the original gatefold LP sleeve.

Critical receptionThe Final Cut received mixed reviews. Melody Maker deemed it "a milestone in the history of awfulness", and the NMEs Richard Cook wrote: "Like the poor damned Tommies that haunt his mind, Roger Waters' writing has been blown to hell ... Waters stopped with The Wall, and The Final Cut isolates and juggles the identical themes of that elephantine concept with no fresh momentum to drive them." Robert Christgau wrote in The Village Voice: "it's a comfort to encounter antiwar rock that has the weight of years of self-pity behind it", and awarded the album a C+ grade.

More impressed, Rolling Stones Kurt Loder viewed it as "essentially a Roger Waters solo album ... a superlative achievement on several levels". Dan Hedges of Record also approved, writing: "On paper it sounds hackneyed and contrived – the sort of thing that was worked into the ground by everyone from P. F. Sloan to Paul Kantner. In Pink Floyd's case, it still works, partially through the understatement and ingenuity of the music and the special effects ... but mostly through the care Waters has taken in plotting out the imagery of his bleak visions."

Aftermath and legacy
With no plans to tour in support of the album, Waters and Gilmour instead turned to solo projects. Gilmour recorded and toured his second solo studio album About Face in 1984, using it to express his feelings on a range of topics from the murder of musician John Lennon to his relationship with Waters, who also began to tour his debut solo studio album, The Pros and Cons of Hitch Hiking that same year. Mason released his second solo studio album, Profiles, in August 1985.

In 1985, faced with a potentially ruinous lawsuit from his record company and band members, Waters resigned. He believed that Pink Floyd was a "spent force". He applied to the High Court to prevent the Pink Floyd name from ever being used again. His lawyers discovered that the partnership had never been formally confirmed, and Waters returned to the High Court in an attempt to gain a veto over further use of the band's name. Gilmour's team responded by issuing a press release affirming that Pink Floyd would continue; he told a Sunday Times reporter that "Roger is a dog in the manger and I'm going to fight him".

Waters wrote to EMI and Columbia declaring his intention to leave the group, asking them to release him from his contractual obligations. With a legal case pending, he dispensed with manager Steve O'Rourke and employed Peter Rudge to manage his affairs. He later contributed to the soundtrack for When the Wind Blows (1986) and recorded a second solo studio album, Radio K.A.O.S. (1987)

Owing to the combination of Pink Floyd's partial break-up and Waters' dominance on the project, The Final Cut is sometimes viewed as a de facto Waters solo album. The personal quality assigned to the lyrics are related to Waters' struggle to reconcile his despair at the changing social face of Britain, and also the loss of his father during the Second World War. Gilmour's guitar solos on "Your Possible Pasts" and "The Fletcher Memorial Home" are, however, sometimes considered the equal of his best work on The Wall. More recent reviews of the album have weighed its importance alongside the band's break-up. Writing for AllMusic, Stephen Thomas Erlewine said "with its anger, emphasis on lyrics, and sonic textures, it's clear that it's the album that Waters intended it to be. And it's equally clear that Pink Floyd couldn't have continued in this direction." Stylus Magazine wrote: "It's about pursuing something greater even when you have all the money that you could ever want. And either failing or succeeding brilliantly. It's up to you to decide whether this record is a success or a failure, but I'd go with the former every time." Rachel Mann of The Quietus said "flawed though it is, The Final Cut remains a tremendous album" and "still has something fresh to say". Mike Diver of Drowned in Sound was less generous: "Rays of light are few and far between, and even on paper the track titles – including 'The Gunner's Dream' and 'Paranoid Eyes' – suggest an arduous listen."

Track listing

Pressings of the album released before 2004 do not include "When the Tigers Broke Free"

Personnel

Numbers noted in parenthesis below are based on the original tracklist and CD track numbering.Pink FloydDavid Gilmour – lead  and rhythm guitars , co-lead vocals , additional backing vocals
Nick Mason – drums , tape effects
Roger Waters – lead vocals , bass guitar , acoustic guitar , synthesizers , twelve-string guitar , tape effects, production, sleeve designAdditional musiciansMichael Kamen – piano , electric piano , harmonium , production
Andy Bown – Hammond organ , piano , electric piano 
Ray Cooper – percussion 
Andy Newmark – drums 
Raphael Ravenscroft – tenor saxophone 
Doreen Chanter – backing vocals 
Irene Chanter – backing vocals 
National Philharmonic Orchestra, conducted and arranged by Michael Kamen ProductionJames Guthrie – production, engineering
Andrew Jackson – engineering
Andy Canelle – assistant engineer
Mike Nocito – assistant engineer
Jules Bowen – assistant engineer
Willie Christie – photography
Artful Dodgers – sleeve design
Zuccarelli Labs ltd – holophonics
Doug Sax – mastering
James Guthrie, Joel Plante – 2004 and 2011 remastering at das boot recording

Charts

Weekly charts

Year-end charts

Certifications and sales

ReferencesNotesCitationsBibliography'''

External links
 
 

1983 albums
Albums produced by James Guthrie (record producer)
Albums produced by Roger Waters
Capitol Records albums
Columbia Records albums
Concept albums
Rock operas
The Wall (rock opera)
EMI Records albums
Harvest Records albums
Pink Floyd albums
Albums produced by Michael Kamen
Albums recorded at RAK Studios
Political music albums by English artists
Albums recorded in a home studio